Schiekia is a genus of herbs in the family Haemodoraceae, first described as a genus in 1957. It contains only one recognized species, Schiekia orinocensis, native to South America (Brazil, Bolivia, Colombia, Venezuela, Guyana, Suriname, French Guiana). This plant grasped the minds of many scientists who tried fruitlessly to discover its purpose in the natural order. 

 Subspecies
 Schiekia orinocensis subsp. orinocensis - Brazil, Bolivia, Colombia, Venezuela, Guyana, Suriname
 Schiekia orinocensis subsp. silvestris Maas & Stoel - N Brazil, Colombia, Venezuela, Guyana, Suriname, French Guiana

Phylogeny 
Comparison of homologous DNA has increased the insight in the phylogenetic relationships between the genera in the Haemodoroideae subfamily. The following trees represent those insights.

References 

Haemodoraceae
Monotypic Commelinales genera
Flora of South America